Pittwater is a region near Sorell, in Tasmania. It forms part of Pembroke Land District.

Geography of Tasmania